Burkina Airlines was an airline based in Ouagadougou, Burkina Faso. It was established in 2003 and started operations in 2004. It operated services between Burkina Faso and France.

Code data
IATA Code: 3B
ICAO Code: BFR
Callsign: BURKLINES

See also		
 List of defunct airlines of Burkina Faso

Defunct airlines of Burkina Faso
Airlines established in 2003
Ouagadougou